Erythrococca molleri is a species of plant in the family Euphorbiaceae. It is endemic to São Tomé Island.

References

Acalypheae
Flora of São Tomé Island
Endemic flora of São Tomé and Príncipe
Near threatened plants
Taxonomy articles created by Polbot